Melia Likoswe Douglas is a Malawian politician who served as the seventh Mayor of Zomba, Malawi's oldest city, between September 2015 and March 2017. She was elected to this position following the death of her predecessor, Joana Ntaja in March 2015 thus becoming the city's second female mayor. Previously, she was the Councilor for Central Ward, Zomba and affiliated to the Democratic Progress Party (DPP).

Career 
Douglas served as a Councilor for Central Ward in Zomba. She was elected as Councilor during the August 2015 Malawi Local Government by-elections. In the wake of her predecessor's death , Douglas was elected by fellow Zomba City Council councilors for a one and a half year mayoral term with effect from September 2015

See also
 Joana Ntaja
 Juliana Kaduya
 Politics of Malawi
 Zomba

References

External links 
 Website of Zomba City Council

Living people
Mayors of places in Malawi
Women mayors of places in Malawi
Malawi Democratic Party politicians
Year of birth missing (living people)
21st-century Malawian women politicians
21st-century Malawian politicians